Lihula Landscape Conservation Area is a protected area situated in Lääne County, Estonia. Since 2010, this area belongs to Ramsar sites.

Its area is 6654 ha.

References

Nature reserves in Estonia
Ramsar sites in Estonia
Geography of Lääne County
Tourist attractions in Lääne County